Greenwood Township is a township in Kossuth County, Iowa, United States.

History
Greenwood Township was created in 1869. It was the seat for Crocker County, Iowa during its brief existence from 1870 to 1871.

References

Townships in Kossuth County, Iowa
Townships in Iowa
Former county seats in Iowa
1869 establishments in Iowa
Populated places established in 1869